Rogelio "Ice Cream" Linares (September 20, 1909  – ?) was a Cuban baseball outfielder and first baseman in the Negro leagues and in the Mexican League. He played from 1940 to 1948, with the New York Cubans, Alijadores de Tampico, and the Diablos Rojos del México.

References

External links
 and Seamheads

1909 births
New York Cubans players
Cuban baseball players
Year of death missing
Baseball outfielders